Englerodendron is a small genus of legumes belonging to the family Fabaceae, that are native to tropical Africa.

It is found in the countries of Cameroon, Congo, Equatorial Guinea, Gabon, Ghana, Guinea, Ivory Coast, Liberia, Nigeria, Congo, Sierra Leone, Tanzania and Zaire.

The genus name of Englerodendron is in honour of Adolf Engler (1844–1930), a German botanist, and also; Dendron, a Greek word meaning "tree".
It was first published and described in Bot. Jahrb. Syst. Vol.40 on page 27 in 1907.

A recent study indicates that an early Miocene (Aquitanian) tropical moist forest from Ethiopia may represent a monodominant forest dominated by a prehistoric species of Englerodendron, Englerodendron mulugetanum.

Species
It contains the following species:
 Englerodendron brachyrhachis (Breteler) Estrella & Ojeda
 Englerodendron conchyliophorum (Pellegr.) Breteler
 Englerodendron explicans (Baill.) Estrella & Ojeda
 Englerodendron gabunense (J.Léonard) Breteler
 Englerodendron graciliflorum (Harms) Estrella & Ojeda
 Englerodendron hallei (Aubrév.) Estrella & Ojeda
 Englerodendron isopetalum (Harms) Breteler & Wieringa
 Englerodendron korupense Burgt
 Englerodendron lebrunii (J.Léonard) Estrella & Ojeda
 Englerodendron leptorrhachis (Harms) Estrella & Ojeda
 Englerodendron mengei (De Wild.) Estrella & Ojeda
 Englerodendron nigericum (Baker f.) Estrella & Ojeda
 Englerodendron obanense (Baker f.) Estrella & Ojeda
 Englerodendron sargosii Pellegr.
 Englerodendron triplisomere (Pellegr.) Estrella & Ojeda
 Englerodendron usambarense Harms
 Englerodendron vignei (Hoyle) Estrella & Ojeda

Phylogeny
The following relationships have been suggested for the genus Englerodendron:

References

 
Fabaceae genera
Plants described in 1907
Flora of Africa